"The Mosquito" is a song by American rock band the Doors from their 1972 album Full Circle. In the same year it was released as a single. Billboard called it an "unusual off beat disc" with a "clever Latin beat". The vocal is by Robby Krieger.

Charts

Joe Dassin version

A French-language version was recorded by Joe Dassin as "Le Moustique") with lyrics adaptated by Pierre Delanoë. It was included on his 1972 album Joe and in 1973 released as a single.

Charts

The single "Le Moustique" by Joe Dassin reached at least the top 10 in France and at least the top 5 in Finland (according to the charts, courtesy respectively of the Centre d'Information et de Documentation du Disque and of Intro, that U.S. Billboard published in its "Hits of the World" section).

References 

1972 songs
1972 singles
The Doors songs
Joe Dassin songs
Elektra Records singles
CBS Disques singles
Songs written by Claude Lemesle
Songs written by John Densmore
Songs written by Robby Krieger
Songs written by Ray Manzarek
1973 singles